The 1983 All-Ireland Senior Hurling Championship Final was the 96th All-Ireland Final and the culmination of the 1983 All-Ireland Senior Hurling Championship, an inter-county hurling tournament for the top teams in Ireland. The match was held at Croke Park, Dublin, on 4 September 1983, between Kilkenny and Cork. The Munster champions lost to their Leinster opponents for a second consecutive year on a score line of 2-14 to 2-12. Kilkenny were captained by Liam Fennelly.

References

External links
Match Highlights

All-Ireland Senior Hurling Championship Final
All-Ireland Senior Hurling Championship Final, 1983
All-Ireland Senior Hurling Championship Final
All-Ireland Senior Hurling Championship Finals
Cork county hurling team matches
Kilkenny GAA matches